The Sceptre Mortal is a novel by Derek Sawde published in 1985.

Plot summary
The Sceptre Mortal is a novel in which there is a quest for the Sceptre Mortal.

Reception
Dave Langford reviewed The Sceptre Mortal for White Dwarf #72, and stated that "what can you make of an author who, after 258 solemnly humourless pages, offers a chapter called 'Pit of the Werebats'? Painful."

Reviews
Review by Pauline Morgan (1985) in Fantasy Review, November 1985
Review by David V. Barrett (1985) in Vector 129
Review by Don D'Ammassa (1986) in Science Fiction Chronicle, #86 November 1986

References

1985 novels